This is a list of candidates of the 1927 South Australian state election. The conservative Liberal Federation and Country Party ran a combined ticket for this election, known as the "Pact".

Retiring MPs

Labor

 John Stanley Verran (Port Adelaide) – lost preselection

Liberal Federation

 Robert Thomson Melrose MLC (Southern District) – retired

Murray Liberal MHA Harry Dove Young switched to the Legislative Council at this election, being elected unopposed to the seat vacated by Melrose in the Southern District.

Legislative Assembly

Sitting members are shown in bold text. Successful candidates are marked with an asterisk.

Legislative Council

References

1927 elections in Australia
Candidates for South Australian state elections
1920s in South Australia